Pākaraka, previously known as, Okehu, Maxwelltown, and most recently Maxwell, is a farming and lifestyle community  west of Whanganui, on the North Island of New Zealand.

Toponymy
Local Māori knew the area as Pakaraka ("an abundance of karaka trees"). Europeans first settled the area in the mid-1800s; they named the settlement "Maxwelltown", after Sergeant George Maxwell. Maxwell's actions in this location during Tītokowaru's War were described by Colonel George Stoddart Whitmore as follows:

I wish particularly to mention the extreme gallantry of Sergt G. Maxwell of the Kai Iwi Cavalry, who himself sabred two and shot one of the enemy...

This report omittied that the party that was attacked was made up of children aged between six and twelve who were out pig hunting.

The Wanganui Herald and the reporter were sued for libel and, after gathering evidence and witness statements, the case was heard in the High Court in London. Which found the case proved and the newspaper was fined five thousand pounds. The report on the trial was collated into a book which is in the Alexander Turnbull library.

The area was known as Maxwelltown until 1927, and then just Maxwell. In 2020, the local hapū—Ngā Rauru—partnered with Whanganui District Council to have the name of Maxwell changed.

History
The area in the 1960s offered good pig hunting sites due to the local heavy scrub. The town offers a range of activities, such as the local art gallery (Black Sands Studio), the church, swimming pool, and the newly renovated Birch Park Pool, which is situated towards the Taranaki. The area is heavily Forested. Maxwell beach is a popular attraction as well; many come to see the small waterfall that runs from the farmland to the shore.

Demographics
The SA1 area is part of the larger Mowhanau statistical area.

The SA1 area had a population of 147 at the 2018 New Zealand census, a decrease of 42 people (−22.2%) since the 2013 census, and a decrease of 45 people (−23.4%) since the 2006 census. There were 57 households, comprising 81 males and 69 females, giving a sex ratio of 1.17 males per female. The median age was 39.6 years (compared with 37.4 years nationally), with 30 people (20.4%) aged under 15 years, 24 (16.3%) aged 15 to 29, 72 (49.0%) aged 30 to 64, and 24 (16.3%) aged 65 or older.

Ethnicities were 93.9% European/Pākehā, 10.2% Māori, 2.0% Pacific peoples, 2.0% Asian, and 4.1% other ethnicities. People may identify with more than one ethnicity.

Although some people chose not to answer the census's question about religious affiliation, 61.2% had no religion, 32.7% were Christian, 2.0% were Hindu, 2.0% were Muslim, 2.0% were Buddhist and 2.0% had other religions.

Of those at least 15 years old, 18 (15.4%) people had a bachelor's or higher degree, and 21 (17.9%) people had no formal qualifications. The median income was $40,000, compared with $31,800 nationally. 15 people (12.8%) earned over $70,000 compared to 17.2% nationally. The employment status of those at least 15 was that 66 (56.4%) people were employed full-time, and 30 (25.6%) were part-time.

Culture
The local Pākaraka Marae and Te Whānau Pani II and III meeting houses are traditional meeting places for the Ngā Rauru hapū of Ngāti Maika II.

References

Whanganui District
Populated places in Manawatū-Whanganui